Sara Thompson was a food scientist. She was the quality control supervisor at Stouffer's Food's and worked with Doris Davis Centini during development of the Stouffer's portions of the Apollo 11 space crew's meals eaten in quarantine on their return from space.

References

See also 
Doris Davis Centini

Julie Stewart (food scientist)

Food scientists
Women food scientists
American food scientists
Year of birth missing
Year of death missing